Luigi Furini (Lungavilla Pv Italia, January 29, 1954) is an Italian journalist and author.

Career
Luigi Furini works from 1980 to the journalist group L'Espresso, he wrote a few books on success. The first "Volevo solo vendere la pizza. Le disavventure di un piccolo imprenditore" (I just wanted to sell pizza. The misadventures of a small business owner). The second "Volevo solo lavorare" (I just wanted to work), says the harsh reality of two million of Italians who have lost their jobs (nearly at 50 years old) and not yet of retirement age (with the bar higher and higher capacity). The last book "Italia in bolletta" (Italy in the bill) tells how they do Italians struggling with the crisis (that is, and how if there is, even if Silvio Berlusconi had said in November 2009 that it was over).
Big fan of football and Inter, from 2010 co-hosts the TV program Qui studio a voi stadio on Telelombardia.

Books
 Volevo solo vendere la pizza. Le disavventure di un piccolo imprenditore (2007)
 L'Italia in bolletta. Risparmi in fumo, debiti alle stelle: come si estingue il ceto medio (2009)
 Volevo solo lavorare. Siamo tutti precari: da giovani flessibili, licenziati a cinquant'anni... E la pensione che non arriva (2010)

References

1954 births
Writers from Pavia
Italian journalists
Italian male journalists
Living people